Francis Murphy may refer to:

Francis Murphy (bishop) (1795–1858), Irish-born bishop in Australia
Francis Murphy (Australian politician) (1809–1891), Australian politician and pastoralist
Francis Murphy (diver) (1928–2012), Australian Olympic diver
Francis Murphy (evangelist) (1836–1907), American temperance evangelist
Francis Murphy (judge), Irish judge
Francis P. Murphy (1877–1958), Republican 73rd Governor of New Hampshire
Francis X. Murphy (1915–2002), Catholic theologian and chaplain
Francis Murphy (Irish politician) (1810–1860)

See also 
Frank Murphy (disambiguation)
James Francis Murphy (disambiguation)